Sergey Aleksandrovich Burunov is a Russian actor.

He has appeared in more than 60 films since 2002. Burunov is known for his performances in the parody TV show Big Difference and multiple works as a voice actor, especially known for being the official Russian voice of Leonardo DiCaprio (since 2004), Adam Sandler (since 2008) and Johnny Depp (since 2009).

Filmography

Voice roles

Russian dubbing 
Leonardo DiCaprio:
 2004 – The Aviator as Howard Hughes
 2008 – Revolutionary Road as Frank Wheeler
 2010 – Shutter Island as Teddy Daniels
 2012 – Django Unchained as Calvin J. Candie
 2013 – The Great Gatsby as Jay Gatsby
 2013 – The Wolf of Wall Street as Jordan Belfort
 2015 – The Revenant as Hugh Glass
 2019 – Once Upon a Time in Hollywood as Rick Dalton
 2021 – Don't Look Up as Dr. Randall Mindy

Adam Sandler:
 2008 – You Don't Mess with the Zohan as Zohan
 2011 – Just Go with It as Danny Maccabee
 2012 – Hotel Transylvania as Count "Drac" Dracula
 2012 – That's My Boy as Donny Berger
 2015 – Pixels as Sam Brenner
 2015 – Hotel Transylvania 2 as Count "Drac" Dracula
 2018 – Hotel Transylvania 3: Summer Vacation as Count "Drac" Dracula

Johnny Depp:
 2009 – Public Enemies as John Dillinger
 2011 – The Tourist as Frank Tupelo
 2012 – Dark Shadows as Barnabas Collins
 2014 – Transcendence as Will Caster
 2015 – Black Mass as Whitey Bulger
 2018 – Fantastic Beasts: The Crimes of Grindelwald as Gellert Grindelwald

Matthew McConaughey:
 2003 – How to Lose a Guy in 10 Days as Benjamin Barry
 2006 – Failure to Launch as Tripp
 2008 – Tropic Thunder as Rick "The Pecker" Peck

Simon Pegg:
 2007 – Hot Fuzz as Nicholas Angel
 2011 – Paul as Graeme Willy

Channing Tatum:
 2008 – Step Up 2: The Streets as Tyler Gage
 2009 – G.I. Joe: The Rise of Cobra as Conrad Hauser / Duke
 2013 – White House Down as John Cale

Steve Carell:
 2013 – Despicable Me 2 as Gru
 2015 – Minions as young Gru
 2017 – Despicable Me 3 as Gru

Mark Wahlberg:
 2014 – Transformers: Age of Extinction as Cade Yeager
 2017 – Transformers: The Last Knight as Cade Yeager

Other films:
 2007 – Ratatouille as Remy (Patton Oswalt)
 2007 – Transformers as Captain William Lennox (Josh Duhamel)
 2008 – The Incredible Hulk as Emil Blonsky (Tim Roth)
 2010 – Hot Tub Time Machine as Adam Yates (John Cusack)
 2011 – Gnomeo & Juliet as Paris (Stephen Merchant)
 2012 – The Impossible as Henry (Ewan McGregor)
 2012 – The Lorax as Aloysius O'Hare (Rob Riggle)
 2012 – Seven Psychopaths as Billy Bickle (Sam Rockwell)
 2013 – The Counselor as Westray (Brad Pitt)
 2014 – The Monuments Men as Lt. James Granger (Matt Damon)
 2014 – The Nut Job as Surly (Will Arnett)
 2014 – Dumb and Dumber To as Lloyd Christmas (Jim Carrey)
 2016 – The Angry Birds Movie as King Leonard Mudbeard (Bill Hader)
 2017 – Quo Vado? as Checco Zalone (Checco Zalone)
 2017 – The Death of Stalin as Nikita Khrushchev (Steve Buscemi)
 2018 – Peter Rabbit as Benjamin Bunny (Colin Moody)
 2019 – The Angry Birds Movie 2 as King Leonard Mudbeard (Bill Hader)
 2021 – Peter Rabbit 2: The Runaway as Benjamin Bunny (Colin Moody)
Bill Burnett (writer):
2002 -ChalkZone: as Joe Tabootie (Joe Tabootie)
Video games:
 1999 – The Longest Journey as Crow
 2006 – Dreamfall: The Longest Journey as Crow
 2007 – The Witcher as Jaskier
 2008 – Lost: Via Domus as Elliott Maslow
 2011 – The Elder Scrolls V: Skyrim as Cicero / the Black Door / Azzadal / Valdar / Wyndelius Gatharian / Headless Horseman / Garuk Windrime / the Dunmer Ghost / the Enthralled Wizard / the Ghost of Old Hroldan / the Nightingales guard / Thalin Ebonhand / the Shadow / the Mistman / Fenrig / Haknir Death-Brand / Holgeir
 2011 – The Witcher 2: Assassins of Kings as Jaskier
 2015 – The Witcher 3: Wild Hunt as Jaskier
 2020 – Call of Duty: Black Ops Cold War as Dimitri Belikov / Emerson Black

Russian language films 
 2009-2013 – Mult lichnosti as Vladimir Pozner / Nikita Mikhalkov / Gennady Zyuganov / Sergey Lavrov / Dmitry Medvedev / Dick Advocaat / Viktor Yushchenko / Guus Hiddink / Stas Mikhaylov / Sergey Sobyanin / Grigory Leps / Fyodor Bondarchuk / Nicolas Sarkozy / Alexander Lukashenko / Sergey Bezrukov / Viktor Yanukovych
 2010 – Space Dogs as the sheep dogs
 2013 – Sherlock Holmes as Dr. Watson (Andrei Panin)
 2014 – Kidnapping, Caucasian Style! as Shurik (Dmitry Sharakois)
 2018 – Sobibor as the narrator
 2020 – Space Dogs: Return to Earth as Uncle Yasha
 2020 – Horse Julius and Big Horse Racing as Sultan Rashid
 2021 – Upon the Magic Roads as the Tsar (Mikhail Yefremov)

References

External links 
 Sergey Burunov on kino-teatr.ru

1977 births
Living people
Russian male film actors
21st-century Russian male actors
Russian male voice actors
Russian male television actors
Russian television presenters
Russian game show hosts